Mürren is a traditional Walser mountain village in the Bernese Highlands of Switzerland, at an elevation of  above sea level and it cannot be reached by public road. It is also one of the popular tourist spots in Switzerland, and summer and winter are the seasons when Mürren becomes busy with tourists. The village features a view of the three towering mountains Eiger, Mönch, and Jungfrau. Mürren has a year-round population of 450, but has 2,000 hotel beds.

Mürren has its own school and two churches, one Reformed and one Roman Catholic.

Transport

Mürren station is the terminus of the Bergbahn Lauterbrunnen-Mürren, which consists of a cable car and a connecting narrow gauge railway, it connects Mürren to Lauterbrunnen.

A series of four cable cars, known as the Luftseilbahn Stechelberg-Mürren-Schilthorn (LSMS), provides transportation from Mürren downhill to Gimmelwald and Stechelberg, and uphill to the summit of the Schilthorn and the revolving restaurant Piz Gloria. This was a principal filming location for the James Bond movie On Her Majesty's Secret Service, released in 1969, in which fictional spy James Bond (George Lazenby) made his escape from the headquarters of Ernst Stavro Blofeld (Telly Savalas) and fled four of Blofeld's henchmen in a car driven by his girlfriend Tracy (Diana Rigg).

There is an additional cable car that runs directly from Mürren to Stechelberg, but this is provided solely for the movement of freight and used for public transportation only in times of repair of the regular cable car.

Mürren is also the lower terminus of the Allmendhubelbahn, a funicular.

Recreation
There are a total of 52 km (32 mi) of ski runs with 14 ski lifts (six cable cars, seven chair lifts, three railways, and two drag lifts). There is also off-piste skiing, but guiding is often needed and should be used.

Within the village there is a large sports center with a 25 m swimming pool, sports hall, fitness room, café, information centre and other facilities. There is a large skating rink which is sometimes used for curling competitions as well as a specific curling rink that in the summer is a tennis court. The ice rink is turned into a mini-golf course during the summer months. In the summer there are also tennis courts near the sports chalet.

Politics
Mürren is situated within the canton of Bern, in the district of Interlaken and belongs to the political commune of Lauterbrunnen, together with the districts of Wengen, Isenfluh, Gimmelwald, and Stechelberg. The parish covers the entire valley.

Hotels
There are quite a few hotels in Mürren, including: Hotel Alpenblick, Hotel Alpenruh, Alpina, Hotel Bellevue, Hotel Blumental, Hotel Edelweiss, Hotel Eiger, Eiger Guesthouse, Hotel Jungfrau, Hotel Regina and Sportschalet.

History

Mürren has its roots as a farming village. With the beginning of tourism – both winter and summer – it has grown in size and wealth. Winter sports particularly have been an important part of Mürren's history since the first British winter tourists arrived in 1911. During the First World War wounded prisoners of war stayed here pending repatriation and played a role in developing winter sports. In 1924, the Kandahar Ski Club was set up by Sir Arnold Lunn (whose statue stands outside the rail station) and eight other British skiers. The club takes its name from the Roberts of Kandahar Challenge Cup, first run in (1911). This, the world's senior challenge cup for downhill ski-racing, was presented by Lord Roberts, who won the Battle of Kandahar in the Second Anglo-Afghan War.

Highlights and events
In 1928, the Inferno Race was set up, and continues to this day. The International Inferno Race, comprising cross-country, giant slalom, and downhill races, is the longest (15.8 km, 9.8 mi) and largest amateur ski race in the world with a limit of 1800 participants. It is held in January. The fastest entrants will complete the 15.8 km from the Schilthorn to Lauterbrunnen in only 15 minutes.

References

External links

Tourism information
Schilthorn.ch
Live Webcam at Schilthorn
Myswitzerland - Muerren

Bernese Oberland
Car-free villages in Switzerland
Ski areas and resorts in Switzerland
Villages in the canton of Bern